Mysore, Karnataka, has major five lakes, some of which are under restoration with funds provided by the Asian Development Bank and government of Karnataka. These lakes are:
 Dalavai Lake
 Devanoor Lake
 Karanji Lake
 Kukkarahalli Lake
 Lingambudhi Lake
 Hebbal Lake

References

External links 
Mysore Nature

Mysore
 
L
Mysore-related lists